Kambon-waa is a warrior dance of the Dagbamba of West Africa that emerged following interactions between Dagbaŋ and Asanteman in the mid-18th century. The musicians of Kambon-waa are called Kambonsi (sing: kamboŋa). The terminology Kambonsi   and kamboŋa are also used to refer to the Akan people albeit in a different contextual meaning.

Rhythms of Kambon-waa
Five main pieces characterize the core music of the kambon-waa.
 Sochendi
 Bendewili
 Kambon-waa
 Chakowili: is a small lua basic rhythm that is played in Kambon-waa, particularly during funerals when the musicians are entering or exiting the gambei.

It is played as a pre-performance to notify people of the start of kambon-waa.
 Namyo

References

Dagbon music and dance